Pandit Ritwik Sanyal (born 12 April 1953) is an Indian classical singer and the Dhrupad maestro from Varanasi. He is a retired professor and Ex Dean from the department of vocal music at the faculty of performing arts at Banaras Hindu University. Pandit Ritwik Sanyal received the highest award for music in India, Sangeet Natak Akademi Award from President of India Hon. Shri Pranab Mukherji, 2013

Early life
Pandit Ritwik Sanyal was born in Katihar. He was trained in the dhrupad style of vocal music of the Dagar Tradition, believed to be descendants of Swami Haridas, who lived in the fifteenth century and trained the legendary Tansen. Sanyal also composes dhrupad lyrics.

Between 1963 and 1975, he received his training in Dhrupad under Zia Mohiuddin Dagar and Zia Fariddudin Dagar in Mumbai, India. He received an M. A. in philosophy from Mumbai University and a Masters in Music from Banaras Hindu University, securing the gold medal. He completed his Ph.D. in musicology from the same university, 1980 under the supervision of Prem Lata Sharma.

Career 
Sanyal is a Retired Professor and Ex-Dean from the Faculty of Performing Arts at Banaras Hindu University. He has around 50 published papers in various journals, and also composes dhrupad lyrics. He is a "Top" grade (Dhrupad) artist at All India Radio & Doordarshan, Varanasi.

He has assimilated the Dagarvani tradition of Dhrupad and evolved a distinctive style of his own in the rendering of Dhrupad. He has specialized in advanced technique of Alap - Jod - Jhala, laykari, voice culture and pedagogy both traditional and institutional.

He has performed both in India and abroad, including the UK, US, Italy, Germany, Austria, Switzerland, Sweden, France, Holland, South Korea, Israel, Croatia, Brazil, Australia, Mauritius and Japan. His performances in India include the National Programme of Music for AIR and Doordarshan, the Gwalior Tansen Samaroh, the Varanasi Dhrupad Mela, Harballabh Sangeet Samaroh Jallandhar, Saptak Ahmedabad, all the Dhrupad Festivals of the country and many other prestigious concert platforms of India.

Discography

 Hari Singari, Bihaan Music
 Dhrupad Choir, Bihaan Music
 Sound of Life Pt. Ritwik Sanyal, Bihaan Music
 Pt. Ritwik Sanyal:Makar Records, France
 Hori: Pt. Ritwik Sanyal, Makar Records, France
 Pt. Ritwik Sanyal & Gianni Ricchizzi, Dhamar Raga Shree, Nomadism-Zahyrus Italy
 Pt. Ritwik Sanyal, Nada Records, South Korea (SEM Nada DE 0267)
 Pt. Ritwik Sanyal, Om & Raga Durbari, Dancing to the Flute, Australia

Dhrupad lyricist and composer

Some notable Dhrupad compositions are:
 Raga Purvi (Sooltal) 
 Raga Abhogi (Dhamar) 
 Raga Saraswati (Sooltaal) 
 Raga Kirwani (Sooltaal) 

Pandit Ritwik Sanyal is also creator of many ragas which are very popular with the current generation of musicians. One of the raga that was created over 30 years ago by Panditji and Late Us. Zia Fariduddin Dagar is raga "Shruti vardhani"

(श्रुतिज्ञान) 'Shrutigyan' is the pen name 'छाप' of Pandit Ritwik Sanyal on many of his Dhrupad lyrics and compositions. Recently his composition on Raga Kirwani was very well appreciated in Vicenza, Italy. You can watch this performance on Youtube

Awards and honours

Pt. Ritwik Sanyal has been awarded the prestigious Padma Shri in the field of art and music in Jan 2023 for his work on revival of Dhrupad.

Felicitation by Honorable Governor of Uttar Pradesh Shri Ram Naik for lifetime dedication and commitment to Indian Classical Music under the auspices of Sangit Milon Lucknow, 14 Dec 2014.

Sangeet Natak Akademi Award 2013.
Siti Vaijayanti Samman Siti Mahotsav Varanasi, 2004

Uttar Pradesh Sangeet Natak Akademi Award 2002

Honoured by Kashiraj Trust, Varanasi and Maharaja Travancore Svati Tirunal Award at the Dhrupad festival of Banaras for outstanding contribution to Dhrupad, 1995.

Honoured by Indian Social & Cultural Lover's Organisation (ISCLO)-Varanasi/Calcutta 1990.

Bibliography

Dhrupad Panchashika -Indica Publications -Varanasi April 2015.
Philosophy of Music - Somaiya Publication -Mumbai 1987.
Dhrupad Tradition and Performance in Indian Music -Ashgate, UK, 2004.

References

External links

Pandit Ritwik Sanyal selected for Sangeet Natak Akademi Award 2013

1953 births
Banaras Hindu University alumni
Dagarvani
Hindustani singers
Singers from Bihar
Musicians from Varanasi
Performers of Hindu music
Living people
20th-century Indian male classical singers
Recipients of the Sangeet Natak Akademi Award
21st-century Indian male classical singers
Recipients of the Padma Shri in arts